Ceylon competed at the 1968 Summer Olympics in Mexico City, Mexico.

Athletics

 Wimalasena Perera

Boxing

Men's Light Flyweight (– 48 kg)
Hatha Karunaratne
 First Round — Bye
 Second Round — Defeated They Lay (BUR), 5:0 
 Quarterfinals — Lost to Francisco Rodríguez (VEN), TKO-2

Sailing

 Ray Wijewardene

References
Official Olympic Reports
Sri Lanka at the 1968 Mexico Summer Games

Nations at the 1968 Summer Olympics
1968
1968 in Ceylon